The Grammy Award for Best Remixed Recording, Non-Classical is an honor presented to producers for quality remixed recordings at the Grammy Awards, a ceremony that was established in 1958 and originally called the Gramophone Awards. Honors in several categories are presented at the ceremony annually by the National Academy of Recording Arts and Sciences of the United States to "honor artistic achievement, technical proficiency and overall excellence in the recording industry, without regard to album sales or chart position".

The award was first presented as the Grammy Award for Remixer of the Year, Non-Classical at the 40th Grammy Awards in 1998 to Frankie Knuckles. While the award was under this name, it was presented without specifying a work; when it shifted to its current name in 2002 works were named. According to the category description guide for the 52nd Grammy Awards, the award is presented "to recognize an individual(s) who takes previously recorded material and adds or alters it in such a way as to create a new and unique performance". The prize is given to the remixer(s), not the original artist(s).

French DJ David Guetta, British producer Jacques Lu Cont, and Skrillex have each won the award twice. Kaskade and Steve "Silk" Hurley each have the most nominations at four, although neither artist has won the award. American producer Maurice Joshua was nominated in 2001 and 2003, and then won in 2004 for the Maurice's Soul Mix of "Crazy in Love". Dave Audé was nominated three times for the award, winning once, while Frankie Knuckles, David Morales, Roger Sanchez, Hex Hector and Deep Dish have each been nominated for the award twice and have won it once.

Recipients

 Each year is linked to the article about the Grammy Awards held that year.

Artists with multiple wins

2 wins
 David Guetta
 Jacques Lu Cont
 Skrillex

Artists with multiple nominations

4 nominations
 Kaskade
 Steve "Silk" Hurley

3 nominations
 Dave Audé
 David Guetta
 Jacques Lu Cont
 Louie Vega
 Masters at Work
 Maurice Joshua
 Peter Rauhofer
 Photek
 RAC

2 nominations
 Afrojack
 Axwell
 David Morales
 Deadmau5
 Deep Dish
 Dirty South
 Eric Prydz
 E-Smoove
 Felix da Housecat
 Four Tet
 Frankie Knuckles
 Hex Hector
 Moto Blanco
 Morgan Page
 Mura Masa
 Roger Sanchez
 Skrillex
 Soulwax
 Timo Maas
 Tracy Young

See also
 Audio mixing (recorded music)
 List of Grammy Award categories

References

General
 

Specific

External links
Official site of the Grammy Awards

 
1998 establishments in the United States
Awards established in 1998
Remixed Recording Non-classical